Epic Soundtrax  was an American record label.  A division of Sony Music's  Epic Records, it was established in 1992 as an imprint for soundtrack albums.  It was founded by Epic's then executive vice-president, Richard Griffiths, and Glen Brunman, who served as its head.

The label was central to Epic's 1990s success, with 11 releases cumulatively selling more than 40 million records over a three-year period. Notable releases included soundtrack albums for Judge Dredd, Honeymoon in Vegas,  Singles, Sleepless in Seattle, Forrest Gump, Philadelphia, Free Willy and Judgement Night.

Epic Soundtrax was deactivated in 1997 with the launch of Sony Music Soundtrax.  With Brunman in charge, it served as an umbrella label for all Sony Music soundtrack releases.

References 

Record labels established in 1992
Record labels disestablished in 1997
American record labels
Soundtrack record labels
Companies based in Los Angeles County, California
Defunct record labels of the United States
Sony Music